Thunderbirds Are Go is a computer-animated science fiction television programme produced by ITV Studios and Pūkeko Pictures. It is a reboot of the series Thunderbirds created by Gerry and Sylvia Anderson which follows the exploits of International Rescue (IR), a rescue organisation run by the Tracy family out of their secret island base in the Pacific Ocean. They use technologically-advanced craft for land, sea, air and space rescues in their operations, the most important of which are a set of vehicles called the Thunderbirds, piloted by the five Tracy brothers.

The programme premiered on 4 April 2015 and concluded on 22 February 2020, running for 78 episodes across three series.

Series overview

Episodes

Series 1 (2015–16)

Series 2 (2016–17)

Series 3 (2018–20)

Notes

References

Lists of British action television series episodes
Lists of British animated television series episodes
Lists of British children's television series episodes
Lists of British science fiction television series episodes